Miroslav Brzobohatý (born May 18, 1989) is a Czech professional ice hockey goaltender. He played with HC Litvínov in the Czech Extraliga during the 2010–11 Czech Extraliga season.

References

External links

1989 births
Czech ice hockey goaltenders
HC Litvínov players
Living people
Ice hockey people from Prague
HC Most players